is a railway station operated by the Keisei Electric Railway located in Chūō-ku, Chiba city, Chiba Prefecture Japan. It is 10.9 kilometers from the terminus of the Keisei Chiba Line at Keisei Tsudanuma Station.

History
After land reclamation projects destroyed the shoreline, the station was renamed to its present name on 1 April 1967.

Station numbering was introduced to all Keisei Line stations on 17 July 2010; Nishi-Nobuto Station was assigned station number KS56.

Lines
Keisei Electric Railway
Keisei Chiba Line

Layout
Nishi-Nobuto Station has two opposed side platforms connected by an overpass.

Platforms

External links
  Keisei Station layout

References

Railway stations in Japan opened in 1922
Railway stations in Chiba Prefecture